Elizabeth McIntosh may refer to:
 Lisa McIntosh (born 1982), Australian Paralympian athlete
 Elizabeth McIntosh (artist) (born 1967), Canadian painter
 Elizabeth Peet McIntosh (1915–2015), undercover agent with the OSS during World War II